The Chinese opening (often Chinese fuseki) (Japanese: 中国流布石, chūgokuryū fuseki; Chinese: 中国流布局, zhōngguóliú bùjú) is an opening  pattern in the game of Go. It refers to the placement of Black 1, Black 3 and Black 5 at the start of the game; and so, depending on White's plays, is a complex of whole-board go openings.

It is distinguished by rapid development on the side, rather than making a corner enclosure, inviting White to start an invasion.  It has a fairly long history, originally used by Japanese player Hajime Yasunaga, and introduced to Chinese Go at a later stage, but the Chinese player Chen Zude pioneered it in top-level play.

The Chinese style became very popular in Japan from about 1970 onwards, and has by Go standards a thoroughly-researched theory. It has two variants: high (with 5 in the diagram on the fourth line) and low (as depicted). There is also a so-called "mini"-Chinese fuseki, an attack against the opponent's corner and placement of a stone midway between the attacking stone and a friendly corner. These are now amongst the most important patterns in go opening theory.

Low Chinese fuseki

Low Chinese fuseki (variation)

High Chinese fuseki

Mini Chinese fuseki

Micro Chinese Fuseki

Notes

References

External links
Chinese Fuseki
Mini Chinese Fuseki
MindZine page with history

Fuseki